The 2022–23 Chicago Bulls season is the 57th season for the franchise in the National Basketball Association (NBA). With a loss to the Indiana Pacers on March 5, the Bulls will not be able to improve on their 46-36 record from the previous season.

Draft 

The Bulls own their first round pick.

Roster

Standings

Division

Conference

Game log

Preseason 

|- style="background:#fcc;"
| 1
| October 4
| New Orleans
| 
| DeMar DeRozan (21)
| Nikola Vučević (11)
| Carlik Jones (4)
| United Center16,322
| 0–1
|- style="background:#cfc;"
| 2
| October 7
| Denver
| 
| DeMar DeRozan (22)
| Nikola Vučević (7)
| Zach LaVine (6)
| United Center20,305
| 1–1
|- style="background:#cfc;
| 3
| October 9
| @ Toronto
| 
| DeMar DeRozan (21)
| Vučević, Drummond (9)
| DeMar DeRozan (8)
| Scotiabank Arena16,559
| 2–1
|- style="background:#cfc;"
| 4
| October 11
| Milwaukee
| 
| Patrick Williams (22)
| Nikola Vučević (11)
| Alex Caruso (9)
| United Center19,356
| 3–1

Regular season

|- style="background:#cfc;"
| 1
| October 19
| @ Miami
| 
| DeMar DeRozan (37)
| Nikola Vučević (17)
| DeMar DeRozan (9)
| FTX Arena19,600
| 1–0
|- style="background:#fcc;"
| 2
| October 21
| @ Washington
| 
| DeMar DeRozan (32)
| Andre Drummond (10)
| DeMar DeRozan (6)
| Capital One Arena20,476
| 1–1
|-style="background:#fcc;"
| 3
| October 22
| Cleveland
| 
| Zach LaVine (23)
| Andre Drummond (7)
| Zach LaVine (4)
| United Center21,089
| 1–2
|- style="background:#cfc;"
| 4
| October 24
| Boston
| 
| DeMar DeRozan (25)
| Nikola Vučević (23)
| Goran Dragić (6)
| United Center17,673
| 2–2
|- style="background:#cfc;"
| 5
| October 26
| Indiana
| 
| Zach LaVine (28)
| Andre Drummond (13)
| Ayo Dosunmu (7)
| United Center18,306
| 3–2
|- style="background:#fcc;"
| 6
| October 28
| @ San Antonio
| 
| DeMar DeRozan (33)
| Andre Drummond (14)
| Goran Dragić (5)
| AT&T Center16,562
| 3–3
|- style="background:#fcc;"
| 7
| October 29
| Philadelphia
| 
| DeMar DeRozan (24)
| Nikola Vučević (19)
| Alex Caruso (6)
| United Center19,010
| 3–4

|- style="background:#cfc;"
| 8
| November 1
| @ Brooklyn
| 
| Zach LaVine (29)
| Nikola Vučević (15)
| Zach LaVine (5)
| Barclays Center17,732
| 4–4
|- style="background:#cfc;"
| 9
| November 2
| Charlotte
| 
| Javonte Green (17)
| Nikola Vučević (13)
| Zach LaVine (6)
| United Center17,886
| 5–4
|- style="background:#fcc;"
| 10
| November 4
| @ Boston
| 
| DeMar DeRozan (46)
| Nikola Vučević (12)
| DeMar DeRozan (5)
| TD Garden19,156
| 5–5
|- style="background:#fcc;"
| 11
| November 6
| @ Toronto
| 
| DeMar DeRozan (20)
| Nikola Vučević (12)
| Alex Caruso (11)
| Scotiabank Arena19,800
| 5–6
|- style="background:#cfc;"
| 12
| November 7
| Toronto
| 
| Zach LaVine (30)
| Nikola Vučević (13)
| DeMar DeRozan (7)
| United Center21,142
| 6–6
|- style="background:#fcc;"
| 13
| November 9
| New Orleans
| 
| DeMar DeRozan (33)
| Nikola Vučević (7)
| Goran Dragić (6)
| United Center19,621
| 6–7
|- style="background:#fcc;"
| 14
| November 13
| Denver
| 
| Zach LaVine (21)
| Andre Drummond (11)
| Goran Dragić (6)
| United Center21,602
| 6–8
|- style="background:#fcc;"
| 15
| November 16
| @ New Orleans
| 
| DeMar DeRozan (28)
| Nikola Vučević (10)
| DeRozan, Dragić (7)
| Smoothie King Center14,658
| 6–9
|- style="background:#fcc;"
| 16
| November 18
| Orlando
| 
| DeMar DeRozan (41)
| Nikola Vučević (16)
| Nikola Vučević (7)
| United Center21,031
| 6–10
|-style="background:#cfc;"
| 17
| November 21
| Boston
| 
| DeMar DeRozan (28)
| Nikola Vučević (13)
| Nikola Vučević (6)
| United Center20,786
| 7–10
|-style="background:#cfc;"
| 18
| November 23
| @ Milwaukee
| 
| DeMar DeRozan (36)
| Andre Drummond (8)
| DeMar DeRozan (8)
| Fiserv Forum17,341
| 8–10
|-  style="background:#fcc;"
| 19
| November 25
| @ Oklahoma City
| 
| DeMar DeRozan (30)
| Nikola Vučević (13)
| DeMar DeRozan (6)
| Paycom Center16,082
| 8–11
|- style="background:#cfc;"
| 20
| November 28
| @ Utah
| 
| DeMar DeRozan (26)
| Andre Drummond (10)
| DeMar DeRozan (6)
| Vivint Arena18,206
| 9–11
|- style="background:#fcc;"
| 21
| November 30
| @ Phoenix
| 
| DeMar DeRozan (29)
| Nikola Vučević (8)
| Zach LaVine (7)
| Footprint Center17,071
| 9–12

|- style="background:#fcc;"
| 22
| December 2
| @ Golden State
| 
| Nikola Vučević (23)
| Nikola Vučević (11)
| DeMar DeRozan (7)
| Chase Center18,064
| 9–13
|- style="background:#fcc;"
| 23
| December 4
| @ Sacramento
| 
| Zach LaVine (41)
| Zach LaVine (8)
| Caruso, DeRozan (4)
| Golden 1 Center17,611
| 9–14
|- style="background:#cfc;"
| 24
| December 7
| Washington
| 
| DeMar DeRozan (27)
| Nikola Vučević (11)
| Alex Caruso (9)
| United Center19,265
| 10–14
|-style="background:#cfc;"
| 25
| December 10
| Dallas
| 
| DeMar DeRozan (28)
| DeMar DeRozan (9)
| Coby White (7)
| United Center19,528
| 11–14
|- style="background:#fcc;"
| 26
| December 11
| @ Atlanta
| 
| DeMar DeRozan (34)
| DeMar DeRozan (13)
| DeMar DeRozan (8)
| State Farm Arena17,227
| 11–15
|- style="background:#fcc;"
| 27
| December 14
| New York
| 
| DeMar DeRozan (32)
| Nikola Vučević (7)
| Caruso, Vučević, Williams (5)
| United Center18,820
| 11–16
|- style="background:#fcc;"
| 28
| December 16
| New York
| 
| Zach LaVine (17)
| Nikola Vučević (8)
| Caruso, DeRozan, Vučević (4)
| United Center19,661
| 11–17
|- style="background:#fcc;"
| 29
| December 18
| @ Minnesota
| 
| DeMar DeRozan (29)
| Nikola Vučević (9)
| DeRozan, LaVine (6)
| Target Center16,294
| 11–18
|- style="background:#cfc;"
| 30
| December 20
| @ Miami
| 
| Nikola Vučević (29)
| Nikola Vučević (12)
| Zach LaVine (7)
| FTX Arena19,969
| 12–18
|- style="background:#cfc;"
| 31
| December 21
| @ Atlanta
| 
| DeMar DeRozan (28)
| Andre Drummond (11)
| DeRozan, LaVine, White (5)
| State Farm Arena17,226
| 13–18
|- style="background:#cfc;"
| 32
| December 23
| @ New York
| 
| Zach LaVine (33)
| Nikola Vučević (12)
| DeMar DeRozan (10)
| Madison Square Garden19,812
| 14–18
|- style="background:#fcc;"
| 33
| December 26
| Houston
| 
| DeMar DeRozan (31)
| Andre Drummond (9)
| DeMar DeRozan (9)
| United Center21,561
| 14–19
|- style="background:#cfc;"
| 34
| December 28
| Milwaukee
| 
| DeMar DeRozan (42)
| Nikola Vučević (14)
| DeRozan, Vučević (5)
| United Center21,537
| 15–19
|- style="background:#cfc;"
| 35
| December 30
| Detroit
| 
| Zach LaVine (43)
| Nikola Vučević (9)
| Zach LaVine (6)
| United Center21,667
| 16–19
|- style="background:#fcc;"
| 36
| December 31
| Cleveland
| 
| DeMar DeRozan (21)
| Nikola Vučević (14)
| Caruso, DeRozan (3)
| United Center21,524
| 16–20

|- style="background:#fcc;"
| 37
| January 2
| @ Cleveland
| 
| DeMar DeRozan (44)
| Nikola Vučević (13)
| Zach LaVine (6)
| Rocket Mortgage FieldHouse19,432
| 16–21
|- style="background:#cfc;"
| 38
| January 4
| Brooklyn
| 
| DeRozan, Williams (22)
| Nikola Vučević (13)
| Goran Dragić (6)
| United Center21,418
| 17–21
|- style="background:#cfc;"
| 39
| January 6
| @ Philadelphia
| 
| Zach LaVine (41)
| Nikola Vučević (18)
| Nikola Vučević (10)
| Wells Fargo Center20,766
| 18–21
|- style="background:#cfc;"
| 40
| January 7
| Utah
| 
| Zach LaVine (36)
| Nikola Vučević (16)
| DeMar DeRozan (7)
| United Center21,694
| 19–21
|- style="background:#fcc;"
| 41
| January 9
| @ Boston
| 
| Zach LaVine (27)
| Nikola Vučević (13)
| Zach LaVine (6)
| TD Garden19,156
| 19–22
|- style="background:#fcc;"
| 42
| January 11
| @ Washington
| 
| Zach LaVine (38)
| Nikola Vučević (10)
| Nikola Vučević (5)
| Capital One Arena17,032
| 19–23
|- style="background:#fcc;"
| 43
| January 13
| Oklahoma City
| 
| Zach LaVine (25)
| Nikola Vučević (11)
| Coby White (6)
| United Center21,342
| 19–24
|- style="background:#cfc;" 
| 44
| January 15
| Golden State
| 
| Nikola Vučević (43)
| Nikola Vučević (13)
| Alex Caruso (7)
| United Center20,139
| 20–24
|- style="background:#cfc;"
| 45
| January 19
| @ Detroit
| 
| Zach LaVine (30)
| Nikola Vučević (15)
| Nikola Vučević (6)
|  Accor Arena15,885
| 21–24
|- style="background:#cfc;"
| 46
| January 23
| Atlanta
| 
| DeMar DeRozan (26)
| Nikola Vučević (17)
| Nikola Vučević (7)
| United Center20,938
| 22–24
|- style="background:#fcc;"
| 47
| January 24
| @ Indiana
| 
| DeMar DeRozan (33)
| Nikola Vučević (8)
| Nikola Vučević (5)
| Gainbridge Fieldhouse16,102
| 22–25
|- style="background:#fcc;"
| 48
| January 26
| @ Charlotte
| 
| DeMar DeRozan (28)
| LaVine, Vučević (9)
| DeMar DeRozan (5)
| Spectrum Center17,697
| 22–26
|- style="background:#cfc;"
| 49
| January 28
| @ Orlando
| 
| DeRozan, LaVine (32)
| Nikola Vučević (13)
| DeMar DeRozan (8)
| Amway Center18,846
| 23–26
|- style="background:#fcc;"
| 50
| January 31
| L.A. Clippers
| 
| Nikola Vučević (23)
| LaVine, Vučević (14)
| Zach LaVine (8)
| United Center20,068
| 23–27

|- style="background:#cfc;"
| 51
| February 2
| Charlotte
| 
| Ayo Dosunmu (22)
| Nikola Vučević (12)
| DeMar DeRozan (7)
| United Center20,072
| 24–27
|- style="background:#cfc;"
| 52
| February 4
| Portland
| 
| Zach LaVine (36)
| Nikola Vučević (11)
| DeRozan, Dragić (7)
| United Center20,135
| 25–27
|- style="background:#cfc;"
| 53
| February 6
| San Antonio
| 
| Nikola Vučević (22)
| Andre Drummond (15)
| DeMar DeRozan (5)
| United Center19,291
| 26–27
|- style="background:#fcc;"
| 54
| February 7
| @ Memphis
| 
| Nikola Vučević (28)
| Nikola Vučević (17)
| Dosunmu, Vučević (6)
| FedExForum17,012
| 26–28
|- style="background:#fcc;"
| 55
| February 9
| @ Brooklyn
| 
| Zach LaVine (38)
| Nikola Vučević (17)
| DeMar DeRozan (6)
| Barclays Center16,938
| 26–29
|- style="background:#fcc;"
| 56
| February 11
| @ Cleveland
| 
| Zach LaVine (23)
| Nikola Vučević (14)
| Ayo Dosunmu (8)
| Rocket Mortgage FieldHouse19,432
| 26–30
|- style="background:#fcc;"
| 57
| February 13
| Orlando
| 
| Zach LaVine (26)
| Nikola Vučević (13)
| DeMar DeRozan (6)
| United Center20,767
| 26–31
|- style="background:#fcc;"
| 58
| February 15
| @ Indiana
| 
| Zach LaVine (35)
| Zach LaVine (11)
| Zach LaVine (7)
| Gainbridge Fieldhouse15,599
| 26–32
|- style="background:#fcc;"
| 59
| February 16
| Milwaukee
| 
| Nikola Vučević (22)
| Nikola Vučević (16)
| Dalen Terry (6)
| United Center20,308
| 26–33
|- style="background:#cfc;"
| 60
| February 24
| Brooklyn
| 
| Zach LaVine (32)
| Drummond, Vučević (10)
| Beverley, DeRozan, White (4)
| United Center21,286
| 27–33
|- style="background:#cfc;"
| 61
| February 26
| Washington
| 
| DeMar DeRozan (29)
| Nikola Vučević (13)
| DeMar DeRozan (6)
| United Center21,106
| 28–33
|- style="background:#fcc;"
| 62
| February 28
| @ Toronto
| 
| Nikola Vučević (23)
| Andre Drummond (10)
| Alex Caruso (6)
| Scotiabank Arena19,800
| 28–34

|- style="background:#cfc;"
| 63
| March 1
| @ Detroit
| 
| Zach LaVine (41)
| Patrick Beverley (10)
| Patrick Beverley (10)
| Little Caesars Arena18,098
| 29–34
|-style="background:#fcc;"
| 64
| March 3
| Phoenix
| 
| DeMar DeRozan (31)
| Nikola Vučević (9)
| DeMar DeRozan (6)
| United Center21,169
| 29–35
|- style="background:#fcc;"
| 65
| March 5
| Indiana
| 
| Zach LaVine (42)
| Nikola Vučević (9)
| Nikola Vučević (5)
| United Center21,225
| 29–36
|- style="background:#cfc;"
| 66
| March 8
| @ Denver
| 
| Zach LaVine (29)
| Nikola Vučević (15)
| DeMar DeRozan (8)
| Ball Arena19,896
| 30–36
|- style="background:#cfc;"
| 67
| March 11
| @ Houston
| 
| Zach LaVine (36)
| Nikola Vučević (12)
| Nikola Vučević (6)
| Toyota Center18,055
| 31–36
|- style="background:#fcc;"
| 68
| March 15
| Sacramento
| 
| DeMar DeRozan (33)
| Nikola Vučević (14)
| Zach LaVine (6)
| United Center21,886
| 31–37
|- style="background:#cfc;"
| 69
| March 17
| Minnesota
| 
| DeMar DeRozan (49)
| DeMar DeRozan (14)
| Zach LaVine (5)
| United Center20,109
| 32–37
|- style="background:#cfc;"
| 70
| March 18
| Miami
| 
| DeMar DeRozan (24)
| Nikola Vučević (10)
| DeMar DeRozan (10)
| United Center20,094
| 33–37
|-
| 71
| March 20
| @ Philadelphia
| 
|  
|  
| 
| Wells Fargo Center
| 
|-
| 72
| March 22
| Philadelphia
| 
|  
|  
| 
| United Center
| 
|-
| 73
| March 24
| @ Portland
| 
|  
|  
| 
| Moda Center
| 
|-
| 74
| March 26
| @ LA Lakers
| 
|  
|  
| 
| Crypto.com Arena
| 
|-
| 75
| March 27
| @ LA Clippers
| 
|  
|  
| 
| Wells Fargo Center
| 
|-
| 76
| March 29
| LA Lakers
| 
|  
|  
| 
| United Center
| 
|-
| 77
| March 26
| @ Charlotte
| 
|  
|  
| 
| Spectrum Center
| 
|-

Transactions

Free agency

Re-signed

Additions

Subtractions

References 

Chicago Bulls seasons
Chicago Bulls
Chicago Bulls
Chicago Bulls